Stranger Than Fiction  is an album by various performers, most of whom are professional writers and amateur singers, released in 1998 on Kathi Kamen Goldmark's "Don't Quit Your Day Job" Records. This album is an offshoot of the Rock Bottom Remainders, aka the Wrockers ("writer" + "rocker").

The artists on Stranger Than Fiction include not only many of the Remainders, such as bestselling authors Stephen King, Amy Tan and Dave Barry, but also rock critics Dave Marsh, Ben Fong-Torres and Greil Marcus, film critic Leonard Maltin and such literary heavyweights as Norman Mailer and Maya Angelou. Warren Zevon contributed liner notes and a variety of famous musicians played on the tracks, including Zevon, Jeff "Skunk" Baxter of the Doobie Brothers, and Jerry Jeff Walker.

Proceeds from this project were contributed to a variety of charities promoting literature and literacy.

Track listing

Disc 1

Disc 2

"Rainy Day Bookstores" is a parody of Bob Dylan's song "Rainy Day Women No. 12 & 35".

References

External links
Album page at "Don't Quit Your Day Job" Records website

1998 compilation albums
Amy Tan